Star Crossing Halt railway station was a station between Nannerch and Cilcain, Flintshire, Wales. The station was opened on 2 November 1914 and closed on 30 April 1962. Today the stationmasters house is in use as private residence and the platforms and a waiting shelter are still extant.

References

Further reading

Disused railway stations in Flintshire
Railway stations in Great Britain opened in 1914
Railway stations in Great Britain closed in 1917
Railway stations in Great Britain opened in 1919
Railway stations in Great Britain closed in 1962
Former London and North Western Railway stations